was a town located in Sōraku District, Kyoto Prefecture, Japan.

As of 2003, the town had an estimated population of 36,070 and a density of 1,527.10 persons per km². The total area was 23.62 km².

On March 12, 2007, Kizu, along with the towns of Kamo and Yamashiro (all from Sōraku District), was merged to create the city of Kizugawa.

External links
Official website (English version)

Dissolved municipalities of Kyoto Prefecture